The Texan is a Western television series starring film and television actor Rory Calhoun, which aired on the CBS television network from 1958 to 1960.

Plot
Rory Calhoun plays gunman Bill Longley, "The Texan," who travels across Texas from town to town in the wake of the Civil War. His reputation as a gunfighter precedes him and often brings trouble wherever he ends up next.

Episodes

Series overview

Season 1 (1958–59)

Season 2 (1959–60)

Release

Home media 
Timeless Media Group released 70 episodes of the series on DVD.

Reception 
The show was #15 in the 1958-59 season with an average viewership of 12.4 million, but it failed to rank in the top 30 the following season.

Media information 
Like many of the television Westerns of the 1950s, The Texan was adapted to a comic by Dan Spiegle in 1960.

References

External links
 
 The Texan Season 1 at tvguide.com
 The Texan Season 2 at tvguide.com

CBS original programming
1958 American television series debuts
1960 American television series endings
1950s Western (genre) television series
Television series by CBS Studios
Television shows set in Texas
Black-and-white American television shows
English-language television shows
Television series by Desilu Productions
Television shows adapted into comics
1960s Western (genre) television series